Farfetch is a British-Portuguese online luxury fashion retail platform that sells products from over 700 boutiques and brands from around the world. The company was founded in 2007 by the Portuguese entrepreneur José Neves with its headquarters in London and main branches in Lisbon and Porto. There are many offices worldwide in Guimarães, Braga, New York, Los Angeles, Tokyo, Shanghai, Hong Kong, São Paulo, Dubai, New Delhi and Moscow.

The e-commerce company operates local-language websites and mobile apps for international markets in English, European Spanish, French, Japanese, Simplified Chinese, Traditional Chinese, Arabic, German, Dutch, Brazilian Portuguese, Korean, Italian, Danish, Swedish and  Russian. Farfetch has offices in 14 cities and employs over 4,500 staff.

History
Farfetch was founded in 2007 by José Neves. The company was previously known as Far-fetch.com Ltd from 2007- 2010 and Farfetch.com Ltd from 2010 - 2013.

Farfetch announced its acquisition of London boutique retailer Browns in May 2015.  This boutique is run independently from Farfetch by CEO Holli Rogers who joined the business in July 2015. Rogers was the former fashion director of online retailer Net-A-Porter.

Farfetch developed the proprietary business units Farfetch Black & White and Store of the Future in 2015.

In June 2017, it was announced that JD.com Inc. had bought a stake in Farfetch for $397 million; the Chinese e-commerce company’s largest overseas investment.

In September 2018, the company went public.

In October 2021, Farfetch launched its in-house fashion brand, There Was One. In April 2022, Farfetch announced the acquisition of Wannaby Inc.

Management
Farfetch is led by José Neves, the founder of the business.

IPO 
In September 2018, Farfetch (FTCH.N) listed on the New York Stock Exchange (NYSE), pricing shares above the estimated targeted range leading to a valuation of over $5.8 billion. The IPO raised $885 million for the company after the issue of 33.6 million new shares. Early investors in Farfetch including Vitrurian Partners and Advent Venture Partners, sold up to 10.6 million shares. It was reported that Neves will net $1.2 billion from the IPO.

On 24 September 2018, animal rights activist organization PETA announced that they had purchased shares that would allow them to attend annual shareholder meetings and stop the company from selling fur products.

Current operations
Farfetch achieves approximately 10 million site visits per month and ships to customers in almost 190 countries. As of September 2014, "annual sales of merchandise through the Farfetch site…surpassed £167 million."

In December 2018, Farfetch acquired online sneaker platform, Stadium Goods, for $250 million. In February 2019, Farfetch agreed to merge its Chinese business with JD.com.

In August 2019, Farfetch acquired New Guards Group, the parent organisation of Off-White designer label for US$675million. Immediately following the purchase, Farfetch's shares plunged by over 40 percent .

In November 2020, Farfetch entered into a joint partnership with Richemont and Alibaba. Alibaba and Richemont jointly invest $600 million in Farfetch, taking a combined 25% stake in Farfetch’s Chinese ventures.

In January 2022 Farfetch was reported to acquire Los Angeles based retailer Violet Grey for an undisclosed amount.

Awards and accolades
Farfetch and its representatives have received a number of industry and e-commerce awards:
 Winner: Best New E-tailer Awards – The Drapers E-tail Awards
 Winner: CEO of the Year (José Neves) – Digital Masters Awards

See also
Matches Fashion

References

2007 establishments in the United Kingdom
Online retailers of the United Kingdom
Companies listed on the New York Stock Exchange
2018 initial public offerings